A Certain Magical Index is a light novel series written by Kazuma Kamachi and illustrated by Kiyotaka Haimura, which was adapted into a manga series written by Kamachi and illustrated by Chuya Kogino. The manga was serialized in the Monthly Shōnen Gangan magazine by Square Enix since April 12, 2007, and had its first tankōbon volume published in Japan by Square Enix under their Gangan Comics imprint on November 10. , a total of 28 volumes have been published in Japan. Yen Press licensed the manga for English publication in North America on October 10, 2014, and published the first volume on May 19, 2015.


Main series

Volume list

Chapters not yet in tankōbon format

 175. 
 176. 
 177. 
 178. 
 179. 
 180.

Side stories

A Certain Scientific Dark Matter

A Certain Scientific Mental Out

Volume list

Chapters not yet in tankōbon format

 Chapters 14–16

Others

A Certain Magical Index Comic Guide

A Certain Everyday Index-san

Crossover

The Circumstance Leading to a Simple Killer Princess' Marriage Was a Certain Magical Heavy Zashiki Warashi

A Certain Magical Index × Cyber Troopers Virtual-On: A Certain Magical Virtual-On

References

External links
 Official list of A Certain Magical Index manga 
 A Certain Magical Index at Square Enix 

Certain Magical Index, A
A Certain Magical Index